The 2005–06 season was Futebol Clube do Porto's 95th competitive season, 72nd consecutive season in the top flight of Portuguese football, and 112th year in existence as a football club. Despite finishing bottom of their group in the UEFA Champions League group stage, Dutch coach Co Adriaanse led the Dragões to league and cup double.

Key dates
 20 January 2005: Porto sign Lucho González from River Plate for a €7 million transfer fee. González would join Porto in the summer following the end of the 2004–05 Argentine Primera División.
 15 April 2005: Porto sign Argentine forward Lisandro López from Racing for a €2.3 million transfer fee.
 24 May 2005: Co Adriaanse is appointed as the new manager on a two-year contract, with immediate effect.
 8 July 2005: Porto agree a deal with Turkish defender Fatih Sonkaya on a €1.5 million transfer deal from Beşiktaş.
 21 August 2005: Porto win their first match of the Primeira Liga season at home to Estrela da Amadora.
 31 August 2005: The transfer deadline day sees Marek Čech join from Sparta Prague.
 13 September 2005: Porto lose their first UEFA Champions League group stage match 3–2, to Rangers at Ibrox. Pepe scored both of Porto's goals.
 28 September 2005: Porto suffer a second consecutive Champions League group stage lose to UEFA Champions League debutants Artmedia Bratislava. Porto led the game 2–0, but the Slovak side clawed back to score three goals to give Artmedia all three points.
 15 October 2005: Porto suffer their first league defeat of the season, losing 2–0 to Benfica at the Estádio do Dragão.
 19 October 2005: Porto defeat Italian side Inter Milan in their third UEFA Champions League group stage match. A Marco Materazzi own goal and a Benni McCarthy strike saw Porto claim all three points.
 26 October 2005: Porto play host to Liga de Honra's Marco at the Estádio do Dragão, in a Taça de Portugal fourth round tie. The Dragões defeated the second division side 1–0. Ivanildo scored the only goal of the game.
 1 November 2005: Porto suffer a third Champions League group stage loss after falling to Inter at the San Siro. The Nerazzurri defeated the dragons 2–1. Hugo Almeida scored Porto's only goal of the game.
 19 November 2005: Porto demolish Académica de Coimbra, 5–1 in a Primeira Liga fixture.
 23 November 2005: A late Ross McCormack goal denies Porto a crucial win in their fifth Champions League group stage match against Rangers.
 2 December 2005: A second-half Jorginho strike grants Porto a draw against Sporting CP after Deivid had scored for the visitors.
 6 December 2005: A goalless draw at Artmedia Bratislava's Stadium FC Petržalka 1898 leaves Porto bottom of their group, and eliminates them from all European competitions. Rangers would progress to the round of 16 whilst Artmedia would progress to the UEFA Cup round of 32.
 11 January 2006: Porto defeat fellow Primeira Liga side Naval 2–1 at the Estádio Municipal José Bento Pessoa in a fifth round cup tie. Diego and Lucho González scored Porto's goals.
 15 January 2006: Estrela da Amadora inflict on Porto, their second league loss of the season. The Amadora outfit would defeat Porto at the Estádio José Gomes, 2–1. Lucho González would score Porto's goal.
 18 January 2006: Porto announce the signings of Brazilian duo Adriano and Anderson. Adriano would sign from Grêmio, whilst Anderson signed from Brazilian side Cruzeiro.
 26 February 2006: Porto suffer their third league loss of the season after being defeated by Benfica. The Encarnados would defeat the Portistas 1–0. French midfielder Laurent Robert scored the only goal of the game.
 15 March 2006: Porto progress to the Taça de Portugal semi-finals after beating Marítimo 2–1 at Estádio dos Barreiros. Benni McCarthy scored a goal in extra-time to grant Porto passage into the next round.
 22 March 2006: Porto progress to the Taça de Portugal final after defeating Sporting CP on penalties. The 90 minutes ended goalless, forcing extra-time. Liédson scored in the second half of extra-time. Benni McCarthy equalised five minutes from the end. After João Moutinho missed his penalty, Lisandro López scored Porto's fifth penalty to grant them passage into the final.
 8 April 2006: A late Jorginho strike gives Porto a crucial win over rivals Sporting CP.
 22 April 2006: Porto wins their 21st Primeira Liga title, clinching the title after defeating Penafiel 1–0.
 14 May 2006: Porto win the Taça de Portugal for the 13th time after beating Vitória de Setúbal 1–0 in the final. Adriano scored the only goal of the game.

Players

Squad information

Appearances and goals

|-
! colspan="15" style="background:#dcdcdc; text-align:center;"| Goalkeepers

|-
! colspan="15" style="background:#dcdcdc; text-align:center;"| Defenders

|-
! colspan="15" style="background:#dcdcdc; text-align:center;"| Midfielders

|-
! colspan="15" style="background:#dcdcdc; text-align:center;"| Forwards

|}

Transfers

In

Out

Club

Coaching staff

Competitions

Legend

Primeira Liga

League table

Results summary

Results by round

Matches

Taça de Portugal

Matches

UEFA Champions League

Group stage

References

FC Porto seasons
Porto
Portuguese football championship-winning seasons